Moreno Rock is a rock lying in Gerlache Strait,  west-southwest of Cape Sterneck, Antarctic Peninsula. It was named by the Belgian Antarctic Expedition (1897–99) under Lieutenant Adrien de Gerlache for Argentine scientist and statesman Francisco P. Moreno.

References

Rock formations of Graham Land
Danco Coast